Álex Leonardo Quiñónez Martínez (11 August 1989 – 22 October 2021) was an Ecuadorian sprinter who competed in the 100 metres and 200 metres. Shot to death in October 2021, he was the second runner to be murdered that month, alongside fellow bronze medalist Agnes Tirop.

He won the 100 m and 200m at the 2012 Ibero-American Championships in Athletics, with his 20.34s national record in the 200 m qualifying him for the Olympics.

He ran a new Ecuadorian national record of 20.28 s in the heats of the 200 metres at the 2012 Summer Olympics and qualified himself for the final. He finished seventh in the final.

Quiñónez won the bronze medal at the 2019 World Championships in the 200 metres event.

He qualified to represent Ecuador at the 2020 Summer Olympics in the 200m in Tokyo but was provisionally suspended for "whereabouts failures" less than a month before the games began.

Death
Quiñónez was shot and killed on 22 October 2021, in Guayaquil. He was 32 years old.

Personal bests
100 m: 10.09 s A NR (wind: +2.0 m/s) –  Medellín, 25 May 2013
200 m: 19.87 s NR (wind: -0.1 m/s) –  Lausanne, 5 July 2019
400 m: 46.28 s NR –  Braga, 29 June 2019

Achievements

References

External links
 
 
 
 
 Tilastopaja biography

1989 births
2021 deaths
Ecuadorian male sprinters
Olympic male sprinters
Olympic athletes of Ecuador
Athletes (track and field) at the 2012 Summer Olympics
World Athletics Championships athletes for Ecuador
Athletes (track and field) at the 2011 Pan American Games
Athletes (track and field) at the 2015 Pan American Games
Athletes (track and field) at the 2019 Pan American Games
Athletes (track and field) at the 2018 South American Games
Sportspeople from Esmeraldas, Ecuador
South American Games silver medalists for Ecuador
South American Games bronze medalists for Ecuador
South American Games medalists in athletics
Pan American Games gold medalists for Ecuador
Pan American Games medalists in athletics (track and field)
World Athletics Championships medalists
Pan American Games gold medalists in athletics (track and field)
Medalists at the 2019 Pan American Games
South American Games gold medalists in athletics
Deaths by firearm in Ecuador
Ecuadorian murder victims
People murdered in Ecuador
Male murder victims
21st-century Ecuadorian people